The California Golden Bears softball team is the college softball team representing the University of California, Berkeley in NCAA Division I. The team plays its home games at Levine-Fricke Field, which is located in Strawberry Canyon near California Memorial Stadium. While the stadium was built in 1995, it is not up to the standards of the NCAA, and therefore cannot host NCAA tournament games. California softball is one of the most consistently successful programs at the school with a current 26-year NCAA tournament streak and a national championship in 2002. The current head coach is Chelsea Spencer, a former player at California under head coach Diane Ninemire.

History
 The California Golden Bears softball team has been one of the most consistently successful programs at the University of California since its inaugural season in 1972. Through the program's first forty years (1972–2011), it has had a record of 1,445–705–3 which is a .672 win percentage. The Bears are consistently ranked in the top 25, have reached the postseason for 27 straight years, have reached the Women's College World Series 14 times (11 NCAA, 3 AIAW), and have won 1 Women's College World Series Championship in 2002. The current head coach is Diane Ninemire, who is currently in her 25th season leading California's softball program. Ninemire holds the California school record for most all-time wins by a coach, and has an overall record of 1,059–509 (.675). The current home field of the California Golden Bears softball program is Levine-Fricke Field located in Strawberry Canyon behind California Memorial Stadium and Witter Rugby Field and the programs offices are located in the Simpson Center for Student Athlete High Performance. Levine-Fricke Field opened in 1995 with a capacity of 500 permanent seats and it was announced by the athletic department that the stadium had expanded to 1,204 seats on April 11, 2012. Despite the fact that Levine-Fricke Field is relatively new (compared to California's other facilities), it is not up to the standards needed to host NCAA Tournament games so even though California has received a national seed multiple times in its history, they have never been able to host a regional or super regional. Before moving into Levine-Fricke Field, softball played at a facility called Strawberry Field right next to the current stadium where Witter Rugby Field is now located, before that, the team played at Hearst Field (now the Hearst Field Annex) near the Hearst Gymnasium.

2002 season
In 2002, the California Golden Bears softball program won its first national championship after defeating the defending national champion Arizona Wildcats on May 27, 2002. There were high expectations heading into the 2002 campaign after reaching the Women's College World Series from 1999 to 2001 and with the Bears ranked #5 in the preseason poll. They remained in the national rankings (never falling out of the top 10) until they were the unanimous #1 after clinching the national championship and the Bears finished the 2002 campaign with a 56–19 (12–9, Pac–10), good for 4th in Pacific–10 Conference. After winning the national championship in 2002, the most outstanding player of the tournament was senior RHP Jocelyn Forest and Diane Ninemire and her coaching staff were named the Speedline/NFCA Division I Coaching Staff of the Year.

2012 season

The 2012 season began for the Golden Bears with extremely high expectations with head coach Diane Ninemire going as far as comparing her 2012 squad to the 2002 national championship team. The Bears started the season as #3 in the NFCA poll and spent most of the season as the #1 team in the country in both the ESPN and NFCA polls. The Golden Bears compiled a record of 50–4 (21–3 in conference play), received the overall #1 seed in the 2012 NCAA Division I softball tournament, and thanks to upgrades at Levine-Fricke Field, California will be able to host tournament games for the first time since 1993.

Season-by-season results

|-
| colspan="2"  style="text-align:center" | Total: || 1,445–705–3 (.672) || colspan="4" |

Source: 2012 Golden Bears Record Book

Coaches

Source:
University of California Athletic Department

Notable players

Conference awards
Pac-12 Player of the Year
Valeria Arioto (2012)

Pac-12 Pitcher of the Year
Kristina Thorson (2006)
Jolene Henderson (2011, 2012)

Pac-12 Coach of the Year
Donna Terry (1987)
Diane Ninemire (1991, 2012)

See also
List of NCAA Division I softball programs

Notes

References